Irma Avegno (20 December 1881 – June 1913) was a Uruguayan woman of Montevidean high society who devoted herself to financial affairs.

Biography
Irma Avegno was the daughter of Emilio Avegno and María de Ávila, according to her birth certificate. She belonged to a wealthy family linked to the land and, politically, to the Colorado Party. Her father was deputy of that party for Artigas Department, and her uncle, Dr. José Romeu, was Secretary of State, both during the second government of José Batlle y Ordóñez.

She was considered in her own time as a liberal and transgressive person, since she dedicated herself to financial business (she was a moneylender) and to activities traditionally reserved for men, such as betting on horse races. Her openly stated homosexual orientation, which could only be recognized implicitly at the time, also contributed to that perception.

Death
Avegno died in strange circumstances in Lomas de Zamora, Buenos Aires Province, Argentina, as a fugitive from Uruguayan justice. The scandal unleashed by the debts that she left after escaping from the country sent a shockwave through the government of Batlle y Ordóñez. The official cause of death was suicide.

Her body was buried in the Central Cemetery of Montevideo, after having arrived on the steamer Roma, which was awaited by a crowd.

Works about her life
 Armas, Dino (2012). Se ruega no enviar coronas (theater). Montevideo: Estuario 
  (2000). Una mujer inconveniente: la historia de Irma Avegno (narrative). Montevideo: Fin de Siglo

References

1881 births
1913 suicides
Burials at the Central Cemetery of Montevideo
Fugitives
Uruguayan lesbians
20th-century Uruguayan LGBT people
People from Montevideo
Suicides in Argentina
Uruguayan women in business